WebSharper is an open-source and commercial web-programming framework that allows web developers to create and maintain complex JavaScript and HTML5 front-end applications in the F# programming language. Other than a few native libraries, everything is F# source.

Overview
WebSharper includes support for jQuery, HTML5, DOM and EcmaScript. WebSharper Mobile includes support for Android, iOS and Windows Phone Formlets and Sitelets.

Unlike many other web-programming toolkits, WebSharper offers a rich set of abstractions and DSL syntax for common web-related chores, such as composing HTML, defining web forms, managing required resources and handling URLs safely.

Extensions
WebSharper extensions include 
 Bing Maps
 DHTMLX
 Ext JS
 Formlets for jQuery UI
 Formlets for jQuery Mobile
 GlMatrix
 Google Maps
 Google Visualization
 InfoVis
 jQuery Mobile
 jQuery Tools
 jQuery UI
 Kendo UI
 Modernizr
 O3D
 Protovis
 Raphael
 Sencha Touch
 TinyMCE
 Twitter
 WebGL
 YUI

Development Environments

WebSharper can be used with any text editor. WebSharper can also be used with Visual Studio  templates with full ASP.NET integration and with MonoDevelop.

Mobile 
As a general framework for making web apps, WebSharper is also capable of being used as a framework for making mobile and tablet apps, either by making the needed widgets and animations from scratch, or by using one of the mobile frameworks for WebSharper. An HTML5 app written in WebSharper can have separate views for Tablets and Mobile phones.

Examples 

The following sample displays a single HTML paragraph:
[<JavaScript>]
let Main = Div [ P [Text "Welcome"] ]  
The matching server-side code is also written in F#:
type HelloWorldViewer() =
    inherit Web.Control()
  
    [<JavaScript>]
    override this.Body = HelloWorld.Main :> Html.IPagelet

See also
 F#
 Comparison of JavaScript frameworks
 Comparison of web frameworks

Notes

References

External links
 Official website

Web development software